Collagen alpha-1(VIII) chain is a protein that in humans is encoded by the COL8A1 gene.

This gene encodes one of the two alpha chains of type VIII collagen. The gene product is a short chain collagen and a major component of the basement membrane of the corneal endothelium. The type VIII collagen fibril can be either a homo- or a heterotrimer. Alternatively spliced transcript variants encoding the same isoform have been observed.

References

Further reading